"Save the Badger Badger Badger" is a mashup of Jonti Picking's 2003 viral Flash animation Badgers and "Flash" by Queen. The song was released on 19 May 2013, in response to proposed badger culling in the United Kingdom. The song features vocals and guitar from Brian May and visuals reminiscent to the 1980 film Flash Gordon, in addition to vocals from Weebl and Brian Blessed. Said May of the song:

Charts
On 1 September 2013, the song charted at #79 on the UK Singles Chart, #39 on the UK iTunes chart and #1 on the iTunes Rock chart. This can likely be attributed to the song being the subject of an episode of the Last Leg which aired live at 10pm on Channel 4 on Wednesday 28 August, where host Adam Hills said in no uncertain terms "by next week I want to see this song on the charts. If you’re watching the show now, do whatever you can to play it during the week. If you're a DJ put it on the radio, if you're at a wedding, make it the first dance". The RSPCA also issued their support for it and vocal contributor Brian Blessed had a few words of his own:

References

2013 singles
Brian May songs
Songs about mammals
Songs about animal rights